The 2020 United States Senate special election in Arizona was held on November 3, 2020, following the death in office of incumbent Republican U.S. Senator John McCain on August 25, 2018. Governor Doug Ducey was required by Arizona law to appoint a Republican to fill the vacant seat until a special election could be held. On September 5, 2018, Ducey appointed former U.S. Senator Jon Kyl to fill McCain's seat. However, Kyl announced he would resign on December 31, 2018.

On December 18, 2018, Ducey announced that outgoing U.S. Representative Martha McSally would be appointed to fill the seat following Kyl's resignation. McSally was sworn in as the state's junior U.S. Senator on January 3, 2019, less than two months after she was defeated by Democrat Kyrsten Sinema for Arizona's Class 1 U.S. Senate seat. McSally ran to complete the term, defeating skincare executive Daniel McCarthy in the Republican primary. She faced former astronaut Mark Kelly, who ran uncontested in the Democratic primary. Primary elections took place on August 4, 2020.

Once a reliably Republican state, Arizona trended more purple in the late 2010s. Kelly significantly outraised McSally and led by about 5% in the average poll leading up to Election Day.

Kelly defeated McSally by a margin of 2.4% on election night, thereby flipping the seat Democratic. As a result, he outperformed Joe Biden in the concurrent presidential election, who defeated President Donald Trump by 0.3%, but underperformed his polling average. Kelly became the first Democrat to win the Class 3 Senate seat since Carl Hayden won his last term in 1962. This also marked the first time since the 82nd Congress preceding the 1952 election that Democrats held both Senate seats in Arizona.

Kelly was sworn in on December 2, 2020.

Interim appointments

Appointees
 Jon Kyl, former U.S. Senator, former U.S. Representative for Arizona's 4th congressional district and former Senate Minority Whip, resigned December 31, 2018
 Martha McSally, former U.S. Representative for Arizona's 2nd congressional district, 2018 Republican nominee for U.S. Senate, assumed office January 3, 2019

Potential candidates not appointed
 Kirk Adams, incumbent chief of staff to incumbent Governor of Arizona Doug Ducey and former Speaker of the Arizona House of Representatives
 Barbara Barrett, Secretary of the Air Force and former United States Ambassador to Finland
 Jan Brewer, former Governor of Arizona and former Secretary of State of Arizona
 Paul Gosar, incumbent U.S. Representative for Arizona's 4th congressional district
 Eileen Klein, former Treasurer of Arizona and former chief of staff to former governor of Arizona Jan Brewer
 Cindy McCain, widow of former U.S. senator John McCain
 Meghan McCain, daughter of former U.S. senator John McCain
 Mick McGuire, incumbent Adjutant General of the Arizona National Guard
 Karrin Taylor Robson, businesswoman and incumbent member of the Arizona Board of Regents
 Matt Salmon, former U.S. Representative, 2002 gubernatorial nominee and former Chairperson of the Arizona Republican Party
 David Schweikert, incumbent U.S. Representative for Arizona's 6th congressional district
 John Shadegg, former U.S. Representative for Arizona's 3rd congressional district
 Kelli Ward, former candidate for U.S. Senate in 2016 and 2018
 Grant Woods, former Republican Arizona Attorney General and former congressional chief of staff to former U.S. senator John McCain

Republican primary
Incumbent McSally faced one challenger: Daniel McCarthy, a skincare company executive. Upon his respective announcements, McCarthy's independent wealth was expected to set up a bruising and expensive primary campaign, however, McSally won the primary in a landslide.

Candidates

Nominee
 Martha McSally, incumbent U.S. Senator and former U.S. Representative for Arizona's 2nd congressional district

Eliminated in primary
 Sean Lyons (as a write-in candidate)
 Daniel McCarthy, skincare company executive

Withdrawn
 Craig Brittain, former revenge porn site operator
 PT Burton
 Mark Cavener
 Floyd Getchell
 Ann Griffin, former teacher
 Josue Larose, 2016 Republican presidential candidate and 2012 Republican candidate for Louisiana's 2nd congressional district

Declined
 Kirk Adams, incumbent chief of staff to incumbent Governor of Arizona Doug Ducey and former Speaker of the Arizona House of Representatives
 Joe Arpaio, former Sheriff of Maricopa County and candidate for U.S. Senate in 2018 (running for Maricopa County Sheriff)
 Doug Ducey, Governor of Arizona
 Paul Gosar, U.S. Representative for Arizona's 4th congressional district
 Jon Kyl, former U.S. senator, former U.S. Representative for Arizona's 4th congressional district and former Senate Minority Whip
 Blake Masters, President of the Thiel Foundation
 Curt Schilling, former Major League Baseball player and Blaze Media commentator
 Fife Symington, former Governor of Arizona

Endorsements

Primary results

Democratic primary

Candidates

Nominee
 Mark Kelly, retired American astronaut, engineer, retired U.S. Navy Captain and husband of former U.S. Representative Gabby Giffords

Eliminated in primary
 Bo "Heir Archy" Garcia (as a write-in candidate)

Withdrew
 Mohammad Arif, businessman and perennial candidate (write-in) (switched to Democratic general election write-in candidacy)
 Sheila Bilyeu, Democratic candidate for the 2020 United States Senate election in Oklahoma
 Juan Angel Vasquez

Declined
 Ruben Gallego, incumbent U.S. Representative for Arizona's 7th congressional district (running for re-election) (endorsed Mark Kelly)
 Katie Hobbs, Secretary of State of Arizona
 Grant Woods, former Republican Arizona Attorney General and former congressional chief of staff to former U.S. senator John McCain

Endorsements

Primary results

Libertarian primary
Neither one of the write-in candidates received enough votes to secure the Libertarian nomination in the general election.

Write-in candidates

Eliminated in primary
 Barry Hess, write-in Libertarian candidate in the 2018 United States Senate election in Arizona and Libertarian nominee in the 2014 Arizona gubernatorial election
 Alan White

Primary results

Other candidates

General election write-in candidates

Declared
Republican
 Edward Davida
 John Schiess
 Debbie Simmons
 Patrick "Pat" Thomas
Democratic
 Perry Kapadia
 Mohammed "Mike Obama" Arif
 Adam Chilton
 Buzz Stewart
Other
 Christopher Beckett, veteran (Independent)
 William "Will" Decker (Independent)
 Matthew "Doc" Dorchester (Libertarian)
 Nicholas N. Glenn, navy veteran and aerospace engineer (Independent Republican)
 Mathew Haupt (Independent)
 Benjamin Rodriguez (Independent)
 Joshua Rodriguez (Unity)
 Frank Saenz (Independent)
 Jim Stevens (Independent)

Withdrawn
 Robert Kay (Independent)

General election

Debates
 Complete video of debate, October 6, 2020

Predictions

Endorsements

Polling

Graphical summary

Aggregate polls

with Daniel McCarthy and Mark Kelly

with Ruben Gallego

on whether McSally deserves to be re-elected

with generic Republican and generic Democrat

Results

Counties that flipped from Republican to Democratic
 Maricopa (largest municipality: Phoenix)

See also

 2020 Arizona elections

Notes

Partisan clients

References

Further reading

External links
 

Official campaign websites
 Mark Kelly (D) for Senate
 Martha McSally (R) for Senate

Arizona 2020
Arizona 2020
2020 Special
Arizona Special
United States Senate Special
United States Senate 2020